The Firehouse No. 3 in Sacramento, California, which has also been known as Engine Co. #3 Firehouse, was built in 1893.  It is located at 1215 19th St.  It was listed on the National Register of Historic Places in 1991.

It is two-story-plus  plan building with elements of Classical Revival style including its symmetry, pediments, and decoration.

See also 
 Fire Station No. 6 (Sacramento, California)
 National Register of Historic Places listings in Sacramento County, California

References

Fire stations on the National Register of Historic Places in California
National Register of Historic Places in Sacramento, California
Neoclassical architecture in California
Fire stations completed in 1893
1893 establishments in California